A district of Uttarakhand state is an administrative geographical unit, headed by a District Magistrate (earlier called District Collector), an officer belonging to the Indian Administrative Service. The district magistrates are assisted by a number of officers (such as deputy collector, assistant collector, additional district magistrate, sub-divisional magistrate, tehsildar, naib tehsildar belonging to the Uttarakhand Civil Service and other Uttarakhand state services.

A Superintendent of Police, an officer belonging to the Indian Police Service, heads the police in the district and is entrusted with the responsibility of maintaining law and order and related issues. He is assisted by the officers of the Uttarakhand Police Service.

A Deputy Conservator of Forests, an officer belonging to the Indian Forest Service, is responsible for managing the Forests, environment and wild-life related issues of the district. He is assisted by the officers of the Uttarakhand Forest Service and other Uttarakhand forest officials and Uttarakhand wildlife officials.

Sectoral development is looked after by the district head of each development department such as Public works, Health, Education, Agriculture, Animal husbandry, etc. These officers belong to the various Uttarakhand state services.

Four new districts are proposed in Uttarakhand: Didihat, Kotdwar, Ranikhet and Yamunotri.

List of districts

Proposed districts

In November 2000 when uttarakhand was created as a new state it had inherited 13 districts. As of november 2022, since then no new districts have been created even though other newly created states have almost doubled the number of new districts for rapid development.

 2011 BJP plan for 5 new districts:
BJP had planned the following for districts which did not matter last due to the change in the government.

 2016 INC plan for 10 new districts (including 4 districts from earlier 2011 BJP plan):

 Kashipur, from Udham Singh Nagar district.
 Roorkee, from Haridwar district.
 Gairsain, from Chamoli district.
 Rishikesh, from Dehradun district, Tehri Garhwal district, and Pauri Garhwal district.
 Narendra Nagar or  Pratapnagar, from Udham Singh Nagar district with headquarter at either of the two places.
 Ramnagar, from Nainital district.

 Additional demands for new districts:'''
From time to time, several chief ministers and elected representatives, such as MLAs and MPs, have proposed the following new districts:

 Chakrata, from Dehradun district.
 Dharchula, from Pithoragarh district.
 Gangotri and Purola, from Uttarkashi district.
 Haldwani, from Nainital district.
 Karnaprayag and Tharali, from Chamoli district.
 other proposed are Ghastoli, Meelam (Milam), Dugtu, Gunji, Munsiari (Munsyari), Niti, Tyuni, Thalisain, Syaldey/Ataliya, etc

See also
 Administrative divisions of Uttarakhand
 List of parganas of Uttarakhand
 List of tehsils of Uttarakhand
 List of community development blocks of Uttarakhand
 List of districts in India

References

External links
More about Uttarakhand at state

Districts
Uttarakhand